The Happy Years is a 1950 film based on the 1910 novel The Varmint by Owen Johnson. It concerns the adventures of Dink Stover, a boy attending the Lawrenceville School in New Jersey. Robert Wagner made his film debut in a small, uncredited role as Adams, the catcher for Cleve House.

Plot
Expelled from other preparatory schools, most recently after causing a campus explosion, young John Humperdink Stover is given one last chance by his father to find maturity and discipline along with a proper education. On the way to a new academy, Stover promptly disrupts the trip of a fellow carriage passenger, Mr. Hopkins, by causing the horse to break into a gallop. He is unaware that Hopkins is the Latin teacher and house-master at his school.

Promptly given the nickname "Dink," he becomes acquainted with other students like "Tough" McCarty and "Tennessee" Shad and immediately starts getting into fights. The rivalry spills onto the football field and also includes elaborate pranks played on a girl, Connie Brown, during the summer break. On the verge of being kicked out of yet another school, Dink comes to his senses just in time, making his father proud at last.

Cast
 Dean Stockwell as Dink Stover
 Darryl Hickman as Tough McCarty
 Scotty Beckett as Tennessee Shad
 Leo G. Carroll as Mr. Hopkins
 Leon Ames as Sam Stover
 Margalo Gillmore as Maude Stover
 Elinor Donahue as Connie (billed as Mary Eleanor Donahue)
 Claudia Barrett as Dolly Travers
 Robert Wagner as Adams

Reception
According to MGM records, the movie earned $680,000 in the US and Canada and $175,000 elsewhere, making a loss of $1,096,000 for the studio.

References

External links
 The Happy Years at TCMDB
 
 
 

1950 films
Metro-Goldwyn-Mayer films
1950s English-language films
1950 romantic comedy films
American romantic comedy films
Films scored by Leigh Harline
Films set in New Jersey
Films directed by William A. Wellman
1950s American films